Freemanville is a section of Port Orange, Florida that was settled by freed blacks after the U.S. Civil War. John Milton Hawks brought freed blacks to the area to work at his sawmill, but a variety of issues caused it to fail and the colony struggled. Some colonists remained in the area and settled the area that later became known as Freemanville. The Mount Moriah Baptist Church (constructed in 1911) is believed to be the area's last remaining remnant building. A commemorative plaque and an annual Freemanville commemoration celebrate the area's heritage. Esther Hill Hawks established what may have been Florida's first integrated school to serve the area.

References

Further reading
A Free Man's Dream/The Rise and Fall of a Community: Freemanville, Florida

Neighborhoods in Florida
Populated places in Volusia County, Florida
African-American history of Florida
Populated places established by African Americans